"" ("Woman is fickle") is the Duke of Mantua's canzone from the beginning of act 3 of Giuseppe Verdi's opera Rigoletto (1851). The canzone is famous as a showcase for tenors. Raffaele Mirate's performance of the bravura aria at the opera's 1851 premiere was hailed as the highlight of the evening. Before the opera's first public performance (in Venice), the aria was rehearsed under tight secrecy: a necessary precaution, as "" proved to be incredibly catchy, and soon after the aria's first public performance it became popular to sing among Venetian gondoliers.

As the opera progresses, the reprise of the tune in the following scenes contributes to Rigoletto's confusion as he realizes from the sound of the Duke's lively voice coming from the tavern (offstage) that the body in the sack over which he had grimly triumphed was not that of the Duke after all: Rigoletto had paid Sparafucile, an assassin, to kill the Duke, but Sparafucile had deceived Rigoletto by indiscriminately killing Gilda, Rigoletto's beloved daughter, instead.

Music

The aria is in the key of B major with a time signature of 3/8 and a tempo mark of allegretto. The vocal range extends from F to A with a tessitura from F to F. Eight bars form the orchestral introduction, followed by a one-bar general rest. Each verse and the refrain covers eight bars; the whole aria is 87 bars long.

The almost comical-sounding theme of "" is introduced immediately. The theme is repeated several times in the approximately two to three minutes it takes to perform the aria, but with the important—and obvious—omission of the last bar. This has the effect of driving the music forward as it creates the impression of being incomplete and unresolved, which it is, ending not on the tonic (B) or dominant (F) but on the submediant (G). Once the Duke has finished singing, however, the theme is once again repeated; but this time it includes the last, and conclusive, bar and finally resolving to the tonic of B major. The song is in strophic form with an orchestral ritornello.

Libretto
 
La donna è mobile
Qual piuma al vento,
muta d'accento
e di pensiero.

Sempre un amabile,
leggiadro viso,
in pianto o in riso,
è menzognero.

Refrain
La donna è mobil'.
Qual piuma al vento,
muta d'accento
e di pensier'!

È sempre misero
chi a lei s'affida,
chi le confida
mal cauto il cuore!

Pur mai non sentesi
felice appieno
chi su quel seno
non liba amore!

Refrain
La donna è mobil'
Qual piuma al vento,
muta d'accento
e di pensier'!
 
Woman is flighty.
Like a feather in the wind,
she changes in voice
and in thought.

Always a lovely,
pretty face,
in tears or in laughter,
it is untrue.

Refrain
Woman is fickle.
Like a feather in the wind,
she changes her words
and her thoughts!

Always miserable
is he who trusts her,
he who confides in her
his unwary heart!

Yet one never feels
fully happy
who from that bosom
does not drink love!

Refrain
Woman is fickle.
Like a feather in the wind,
she changes her words,
and her thoughts!
Poetic adaptation
Plume in the summerwind
Waywardly playing
Ne'er one way swaying
Each whim obeying;

Thus heart of womankind
Ev'ry way bendeth,
Woe who dependeth
On joy she spendeth!

Refrain
Yes, heart of woman
Ev'ry way bendeth
Woe who dependeth
On joy she spends.

Sorrow and misery
Follow her smiling,
Fond hearts beguiling,
falsehood assoiling!

Yet all felicity
Is her bestowing,
No joy worth knowing
Is there but wooing.

Refrain
Yes, heart of woman
Ev'ry way bendeth
Woe who dependeth
On joy she spends.

Popular culture
The tune has been used in popular culture for a long time and for many occasions and purposes. Verdi knew that he had written a catchy tune, so he provided the score to the singer at the premiere, Raffaele Mirate, only shortly before the premiere and had him swear not to sing or whistle the song outside rehearsals. And indeed, people sang the tune the next day in the streets. Early, it became a barrel organ staple, and later was used extensively in television advertisements. Football fans chanted new words on the melody, and it was used in video games and films. When all of Italy was under lockdown due to the COVID-19 pandemic, a video of opera singer Maurizio Marchini performing "La donna è mobile" and other arias and songs from his balcony in Florence went viral.

References

External links

; Luciano Pavarotti in Jean-Pierre Ponnelle's 1982 film Rigoletto 
"La donna è mobile", translated by Randy Garrou, Aria Database
Piano-vocal score, IMSLP

Portrait of the aria in the online opera guide www.opera-inside.com

1851 compositions
Arias by Giuseppe Verdi
Compositions in B major
Opera excerpts
Tenor arias